The 2009 New Hampshire Wildcats football team represented the University of New Hampshire during the 2009 NCAA Division I FCS football season. New Hampshire competede as a member of the Colonial Athletic Association (CAA) under head coach Sean McDonnell and played their home games at Cowell Stadium. They won the North Division of the CAA with a 9–2 (6–2 conference) record.

Schedule

References

New Hampshire
New Hampshire Wildcats football seasons
New Hampshire Wildcats football